This is a list of the National Register of Historic Places listings in Cherokee County, Texas.

This is intended to be a complete list of properties listed on the National Register of Historic Places in Cherokee County, Texas. There are five properties listed on the National Register in the county. One property is also a State Historic Site.

Current listings

The locations of National Register properties may be seen in a mapping service provided.

|}

See also

National Register of Historic Places listings in Texas
Recorded Texas Historic Landmarks in Cherokee County

References

External links

Cherokee County, Texas
Cherokee County
Buildings and structures in Cherokee County, Texas